Ecaterina Teodoroiu (born Cătălina Toderoiu; 15 January 1894 – 3 September 1917) was a Romanian woman who fought on the front and died in World War I, and is regarded as a heroine of Romania.

A Romanian Scouts member, she had initially worked as a nurse but she subsequently decided to become a front-line soldier, being deeply impressed by the patriotism of the wounded and the death of her brother Nicolae, a sergeant in the Romanian Army. It was an unusual decision for a woman of that era, so she was sent to the front rather reluctantly. However, with the support of the Romanian royal family, she was able to serve in the military and  eventually came to be seen as a symbol.

Early life
Teodoroiu was born in the village of Vădeni (now part of Târgu Jiu), in the historical region of Oltenia, in the family of Elena and Vasile Toderoiu, both farmers. Ecaterina had five brothers (Nicolae, Eftimie, Andrei, Ion, Vasile) and two sisters (Elisabeta and Sabina). After studying for 4 years in Vădeni and Târgu Jiu at the Romanian-German Primary School, she went on to graduate from the Girls' School in Bucharest. There she joined the first female Romanian Scout troop. Returning home, she became active in another scout troop. Before she could start her preparation for a teaching certificate, the Kingdom of Romania entered World War I in August 1916, on the side of the Allies.

Military career
Working as a nurse, on  Teodoroiu joined the civilians and the reserve soldiers fighting to repulse the attack of a Bavarian company of the 9th German Army at the bridge over the Jiu River, in front of Târgu-Jiu.

Wishing to avenge her brother's death, Teodoroiu asked Colonel Obogeanu to allow her to join the 18th Infantry Regiment as a volunteer. She would soon prove her military skills by using a ruse in order to keep her company, surrounded by the enemy, from being taken prisoner: after announcing in German the decision of the regiment to surrender, Teodoroiu started shooting, killing several Germans and allowing most of the company to escape.

The Germans shot the escaping Romanians through the darkness and wounded Teodoroiu in her right leg. However, she brushed this aside and returned to the company that same evening. She killed at least two Germans during her escape.

On , Teodoroiu was involved in skirmishes close to Bărbătești and Țânțăreni. Later that day, the Germans reached the town of Filiași. Fighting near Filiași on that same day, she was wounded in both legs by a mortar shell, evacuated to Craiova, then to Bucharest and later hospitalized at the King Ferdinand Military Hospital in Iași.

While in hospital, she met Second Lieutenant Gheorghe Mănoiu, the brother of a former school colleague. Upon her release, she asked to join his  as a voluntary nurse.

For her bravery, she was awarded the "Scout Virtue" Medal and the Military Virtue Medal, 2nd Class, on 10 March 1917. On 17 March 1917 she was awarded the Military Virtue Medal, 1st Class, made honorary Second Lieutenant (Sublocotenent) by King Ferdinand and given the command of a 25-man platoon in the 7th Company (43/59 Infantry Regiment, 11th Division), commanded by Second Lieutenant Gheorghe Mănoiu. Thus, she became the first female Romanian Army officer.

On , the 43/59 Regiment, part of the reserve of the 1st Army led by General Eremia Grigorescu, prepared to join the upcoming offensive. On  the regiment left Vaslui for Tecuci, crossed the Siret and camped in the Malta Seacă forest, close to the frontline.

On , the commander of the 11th Division, General Ernest Broșteanu, kindly asked her to stay at the mobile hospital behind the front, but Second Lieutenant Teodoroiu strongly refused him, requesting to be allowed to join her platoon in the upcoming battle.

On , the 43/59 Regiment dug in on the Secului Hill, in the Muncelu-Varnița area.
       
On , the Romanian lines were attacked in force by the German 40th Reserve Regiment of the 115th Infantry Division. While leading her platoon in a counterattack, she was hit by machine gun fire in the chest (according to some accounts), or in the head (according to other accounts). According to the General Order No. 1 issued the next day by Colonel Constantin Pomponiu, the commanding officer of the 43/59 Regiment, her last words before getting hit by machine gun fire and dying shortly afterwards were: "Forward, men, don't give up, I'm still with you!"

Legacy

After the war, Ecaterina Teodoroiu was elevated to the status of a heroine of the Romanian people. Henri Berthelot even named her the "Joan of Arc of Romania" for her outstanding bravery, patriotism and self-sacrifice.

Initially buried close to the front, in Fitioneşti, her remains were interred in June 1921 in a crypt in the city center of Târgu Jiu. Her grave is honored by a monument erected in 1936 by Milița Petrașcu.

In 1921, the Regiment 43/59 Infantry became the honorary name "Ecaterina Teodoroiu". In 1937, by Royal Decree, the Girls' High School in Târgu-Jiu was given her name (currently the National College "Ecaterina Teodoroiu"). In 1938, her native home became a memorial house.

Several monuments were erected in her honor:
 "Ecaterina Teodoroiu" Monument in Slatina, inaugurated in 1925 in the presence of Queen Marie
 "Ecaterina Teodoroiu" Monument in Brăila (1928)
 "Ecaterina Teodoroiu" Mausoleum in Târgu-Jiu (1936)
 "Heroes' Monument" in Azuga (1937)
 "Monument of the Second Lieutenant Ecaterina Teodoroiu" in Muncelu (1972)
 "Ecaterina Teodoroiu" Statue in Târgu-Jiu (1979)

The following films were made about her:
 "Ecaterina Teodoroiu" (1921)
 "Ecaterina Teodoroiu" (1930)
 , directed by Dinu Cocea and starring  in Teodoroiu's role.

Her wartime record was also a subject of Sergiu Nicolaescu's 1999 film , starring  as Ecaterina Teodoroiu.

Kathryn J. Atwood dedicated a chapter to Ecaterina Teodoriu in her work "Women Heroes of World War I: 16 Remarkable Resisters, Soldiers, Spies, and Medics".

On 31 July 2019, the National Bank of Romania announced that in 2020 it would issue the 20 lei banknote, which will feature Ecaterina Teodoroiu. The issue of the 20 lei banknote was postponed to the autumn of 2021 due to the COVID-19 pandemic. In November 2021 the National Bank of Romania announced that the 20 lei banknote bearing Ecaterina Teodoroiu's portrait would be issued on 1 December 2021.

Gallery

See also

Flora Sandes
Milunka Savić
Maria Bochkareva
Leslie Joy Whitehead
Women in the military

Notes

References
Bucur, Maria "Between the Mother of the Wounded and the Virgin of Jiu: Romanian Women and the Gender of Heroism during the Great War" Journal of Women's History - 12, 2, (2000), pp. 30–56, The Johns Hopkins University Press
Constantin Kiriţescu, "Istoria războiului pentru întregirea României: 1916-1919", 1922
 Kathryn J. Atwood, Women Heroes of World War I: 16 Remarkable Resisters, Soldiers, Spies, and Medics, Chicago Review Press, 2014.

External links
 Ecaterina Teodoroiu's biography on www.mariromani.ro

1894 births
1917 deaths
People from Târgu Jiu
Romanian Land Forces officers
Female nurses in World War I
Romanian women in World War I
Scouting and Guiding in Romania
Women soldiers
Recipients of the Military Virtue Medal
Romanian military personnel killed in World War I
Romanian prisoners of war in World War I
Nurses killed in World War I